Lymphatogenous metastasis is the spread of cancer from the vulva, clitoris and bartholin glands. As these other more superficial cancers grow deeper into the surrounding tissue, the risk of lymphatogenous metastasis increases. Vulvar cancers spread primarily to the inguinofemoral lymph nodes. From these lymph nodes, cancer can spread to the pelvic lymph nodes.


Risk
If the depth of the cancer on the vulva, clitoris or Bartholin gland is less than 1 mm, lymphatogenous metastasis is relatively unlikely. When the growth is between 1 and 3 mm in depth, the risk of lymphatogenous metastasis approaches 8%. At the depths of more than 3 mm, the involvement of lymph nodes is expected in at least 20% of the time. Risk continues to increase along with the possibility of contralateral metastasis. Other growth characteristics influence risk of the spread such as the mass of the original growth, the initial location.
Operation techniques. Vulvar cancer at Stage IVA will involve the lymph nodes.

Treatment
Traditionally, large amounts of tissue were removed in a 'radical vulvectomy'. This involved the removal of the entire vulva and the inguinofemoral lymph nodes on both sides with what was termed a “butterfly” incision. Patient survival was correlated to this surgery, sometimes described as "mutilating". In the past two decades individual treatment plans have replaced the standardized "butterfly" surgical techniques. Removal of the inguinofemoral lymph nodes is done separately from the vulvectomy.

References 

Gynaecological cancer
Cancer treatments